Ustilago is a genus of approximately 200 smut fungi parasitic on grasses.

Uses 
Ustilago maydis is eaten as a traditional Mexican food in many parts of the country, and is even available canned. Farmers have even been known to spread the spores around on purpose to create more of the fungus. It is known in central Mexico by the Nahuatl name huitlacoche. Peasants in other parts of the country call it "hongo de maíz," i.e. "maize fungus."

The genome of U. maydis has been sequenced.

See also 
 Corn smut

References

External links 
Ustilago at Index Fungorum

Ustilaginomycotina
Fungal plant pathogens and diseases
Basidiomycota genera